Madre Matilda was a Peruvian pop punk band formed in 1996 and disbanded in 2002. Named after a Pink Floyd track, it had two minor hits in with "Regresa" (an electronic arrangement of a traditional Peruvian song) and "Círculos."

Members

Pierina Less [Vocals]
Carlos Salas [Guitar]  	
Giorgio Bertolli [Drums]
Jorge Olazo [Drums]
Juan José Sandoval  [Bass]
Coco Berenz [Guitar]
Andrés Bretel [Bass]
Vitucho Malásquez [Bass]
Chisco Ramos [Guitar]
Candy Heaventush [Violin]

Discography

 Madre Matilda (1998, Discos Hispanos)
 Círculos (2000, Columbia/Sony Music Perú)

Videography 

 Círculos , directed by July Naters and Sergio París.
 Sin Llorar, directed by Eddy Romero

References
 Discografías : http://raton.pe.tripod.com/discografias/madre_matilda/mmatilda.htm
 Peru.com interviews Madre Matilda 

Peruvian musical groups